Woodland School District 50 is in Lake County, Illinois. The school has approximately 800 students per grade and is the seventh largest school district in Illinois. The district's superintendent is Lori Casey.

The student population is 5,600 students in the grades of Kindergarten through eighth grade. There are four schools: the primary school, the elementary school, the intermediate school, and the middle school. The primary school offers early childhood programs and kindergarten. The elementary school teaches grades one and two. The intermediate school has third, fourth and fifth grades, as well as the third grade dual language program. Woodland Middle School is the home of grades 6–8.

References

External links

School districts in Lake County, Illinois
1948 establishments in Illinois
School districts established in 1948